The Museum of Aquitaine (French: Musée d'Aquitaine) is a collection of objects and documents from the history of Bordeaux and Aquitaine.

History 
In the 16th century, the site of the Musée d'Aquitaine housed the convent of the Feuillants. Destroyed during the Revolution, it became a high school which burned down in 1871, then a university.

In 1960, the Lapidary Museum (created in 1783 by the Academy of Bordeaux) changed its primary vocation and brought together the collections of other museums (Prehistoric and Ethnographic Museum, Museum of Arms and Ancient Objects). It took the name of Museum of Aquitaine in 1963. 

Initially, the museum shared the premises of the Musée des Beaux-Arts de Bordeaux, in a building designed by Charles Burguet.

Then, on January 9, 1987, the museum moved into the premises of the former Faculty of Letters and Sciences, a building built in the 1880s by the municipal architect Charles Durand and located in place of the former convents of the Feuillants and the Visitation.

At the start of the 21st century, the Musée d'Aquitaine had 111,919 visitors in 2003, 88,738 in 2004, 99,880 in 2005, 101,897 in 2006, and 93,661 in 2007.

Location 
In the center of Bordeaux, close to Tour Pey-Berland and St. Andrew's Cathedral, the museum is accessible by line B of the tramway de Bordeaux from station Musée d'Aquitaine.

Collections 
The different collections include more than 70,000 pieces. They trace the history of Bordeaux and Aquitaine from Prehistory to today. 5,000 pieces of art from Africa and Oceania also testify to the harbor history of the city.

The museum has permanent collections and temporary exhibitions. The permanent collections are on two floors. On the ground floor are pieces on Prehistory, Protohistory, Roman Empire, the Middle Ages and the Modern Era. At level 1, there are eighteenth century pieces (Atlantic trade and slavery), world cultures, nineteenth and twentieth centuries (Bordeaux port-e-du monde, 1800–1939).

In 2009, the Aquitaine Museum opened new permanent rooms dedicated to the role of Bordeaux in the slave trade.

Rooms devoted to the nineteenth were reopened in February 2014.

Notable pieces 

 The Venus of Laussel
 The Gallic Gold torque
 The cenotaph of Michel de Montaigne
 Bernini, Bust of Cardinal Escoubleau de Sourdis
 Bronze Statue of Hercules

References 

Museums in Bordeaux
Local museums in France
Archaeological museums in France